Michael Benning is a Canadian collegiate ice hockey defenseman playing for University of Denver Pioneers. He was named as the Tournament Most Outstanding Player in the 2022 NCAA Division I Men's Ice Hockey Tournament.

Playing career
Benning played junior hockey for his team in the AMBHL. During his freshman year in high school, he averaged over a point per game and graduated to the Northern Alberta Elite program. After another outstanding offensive season he began playing Junior A for the Sherwood Park Crusaders in 2018. In his first season with the team, Benning was one of the clubs top scorers and helped them finish second in the league standings. He was named an alternate captain for the following year and continued to put up big numbers. Benning helped the Crusaders win the regular season title, however, the campaign was ended prematurely due to the COVID-19 pandemic. By then, however, he had already shown enough promise for the Florida Panthers to select him in the 4th round of the NHL draft.

After graduating, Benning, along with Sherwood Park teammates Reid Irwin and Carter Savoie, travelled south and began attending the University of Denver. Due in part to a late start and a shortened season, the Pioneers had a poor performance that saw them finish with a losing record for the first time in over 20 years. Despite the difficulties, Denver was still ranked 13th in the preseason poll entering the 2021–22 season. Benning spearheaded the attack from the blueline and helped the Pioneers swiftly rise up the rankings. By the end of the regular season, Denver finished in a tie for the conference title and was guaranteed a NCAA tournament bid. During the postseason, Benning proved to be pivotal in Denver's success, helping the team win three 1-goal games to reach the championship match. With his team down in the third period of the final, Benning assisted on the game-tying goal and then scored what proved to be the deciding marker less than three minutes later. After also assisting on the Pioneers' overtime goal in the national semifinal, he was an obvious choice for the Tournament MOP honors.

Career statistics

Awards and honours

References

External links

2002 births
Canadian ice hockey defencemen
Ice hockey people from Alberta
Living people
People from St. Albert, Alberta
Sherwood Park Crusaders players
Denver Pioneers men's ice hockey players
NCAA men's ice hockey national champions